York Deanery is an historic building in York, England. It has been designated a Grade II listed building by Historic England.

The building, designed in the neo-Georgian style by architects Rutherford and Syme (one of their final works), is of red brick with ashlar dressings. It has a plain-tile hipped roof, with four chimney stacks. It replaced an earlier residence of the Dean of York.

The front gate of the property, which opens out onto the cul-de-sac that makes up the northern end of Minster Yard, is topped by the coats of arms of the Diocese of York.

References

Sources

External links 
1939 establishments in England
Houses completed in 1939
Grade II listed buildings in York
Houses in North Yorkshire
Clergy houses in England